Linden is an unincorporated community in Linden Township, Brown County, Minnesota, United States.

Notes

Unincorporated communities in Brown County, Minnesota
Unincorporated communities in Minnesota